Josef Schmid (1890, in Germany – 1969, in New York City) was a conductor, composer, and composition teacher.  He was one of the first students of Alban Berg, with whom he studied before World War I.  As a conductor Schmid had been an assistant to both Zemlinsky and Erich Kleiber. As a composer Schmid was associated with Berg and Webern but considered himself a musical "godson" of Schoenberg.  After the War Schmid emigrated to New York City and established himself as a teacher of composition, basing his teaching on the writings of Schoenbergs.  His composition students included Robert Di Domenica, Joe Maneri, and Frieda Schmitt-Lermann.

References

1890 births
1969 deaths
German male conductors (music)
German composers
American male composers
20th-century German conductors (music)
20th-century German male musicians
20th-century American composers
20th-century American male musicians
German emigrants to the United States